Komputer is an English, London-based electronic band, composed of Simon Leonard and David Baker.

Background
Collaborating since 1982, Leonard and Baker were originally signed to Mute Records in 1984 under the name I Start Counting and continued with releases under the moniker Fortran 5 until the release of Komputer’s debut album, The World of Tomorrow in (1998).

Simon Leonard and David Baker originally met at Middlesex University where they DJed together and, in 1982 began to collaborate on an electronic pop project, I Start Counting. Both had an abiding affection for pop music as well as a deep love of music in general, although Leonard specialised more in technology and David's bias was on the musical side. I Start Counting released two albums, and, in 1987, supported Erasure on a European tour.

In 1990, the new material they were working on was sounding quite different from their electropop roots and it was decided that a new name, Fortran 5, would give the new dance/techno style a completely fresh start. The duo also began to collaborate with a number of other artists including DJ Colin Faver, Thrash of The Orb, Rod Slater of the Bonzos and Neil Arthur of Blancmange. Remixes were provided by the likes of Vince Clarke, Moby, Joey Negro, David Holmes and Pascal Gabriel, while the duo supplied remixes for other artists including Erasure, Inspiral Carpets and Laibach.

David and Simon then reacted to the tedium of mid 1990s indie guitar music by returning to their Kraftwerk inspired roots which again provoked a name change. The band takes samples from a variety of sources: from Russian cosmonauts to rubbish compactors and mobile phone ringtones.

Komputer's first releases, the Komputer EP from 1996, and the subsequent album The World of Tomorrow were a respectful homage to the duo's German electronic heroes (Orchestral Manoeuvres in the Dark used a sample from "Looking Down on London" for their track "The Right Side?"). Later material saw Komputer absorbing a much wider variety of influences and creating their own unique style of English electronic pop/folk music.

The duo never performed live as Fortran 5, but from the earliest days as Komputer, live shows were very important, leading to many performances all over Europe, most recently appearing at the Short Circuit presents Mute festival at London’s Roundhouse.

For Synthetik, the band’s third album, the music gradually evolved over a long period of time, tracks were tried out in live sets then discarded or reworked in the studio, maturing into a return to the more traditional electro sound of the first album, The World of Tomorrow, with the incorporation of a more experimental and contemporary electronica approach.

References

External links
 
 Official Myspace
 Official website

English electronic music groups
English new wave musical groups
Mute Records artists